Maurice Whittle (born 15 July 1948 in Wigan, Lancashire, England), is an English footballer who played as a left back in the Football League.

External links

1948 births
Living people
English footballers
Footballers from Wigan
Association football defenders
Blackburn Rovers F.C. players
Oldham Athletic A.F.C. players
Fort Lauderdale Strikers (1977–1983) players
Barrow A.F.C. players
Wigan Athletic F.C. players
English Football League players
North American Soccer League (1968–1984) players
Macclesfield Town F.C. players
English expatriate sportspeople in the United States
Expatriate soccer players in the United States
English expatriate footballers